Eluned King (born 1 August 2002) is a British and Welsh track cyclist. She has represented Wales at the Commonwealth Games and won a bronze medal.

Cycling career
King rides for Le Col Wahoo having moved from Liv Cycling Club In 2022, she was selected for the 2022 Commonwealth Games in Birmingham where she competed in the points race and won a bronze medal.

References

2002 births
Living people
British female cyclists
British track cyclists
Welsh track cyclists
Welsh female cyclists
Cyclists at the 2022 Commonwealth Games
Commonwealth Games competitors for Wales
Commonwealth Games medallists in cycling
Commonwealth Games bronze medallists for Wales
Medallists at the 2022 Commonwealth Games